The 1996 Belarusian Premier League was the sixth season of top-tier football in Belarus.  It started on 16 April and ended on 10 November 1996. Dinamo Minsk were the defending champions.

Team changes from 1995 season
Bobruisk, who finished in the last place, have relegated and immediately dissolved after 1995 season. They were replaced by the newcomers Naftan-Devon Novopolotsk, who won the First League in 1995.

Dvina Vitebsk changed their name to Lokomotiv-96 Vitebsk and Shinnik Bobruisk were renamed to Belshina Bobruisk. Torpedo Mogilev changed name to Torpedo-Kadino Mogilev in the middle of the season (in September).

Overview
The championship was played as a double round-robin tournament in the summer season of 1996. MPKC Mozyr won the champions title for the 1st time while spending only two seasons in Premier League and qualified for the next season's Champions League. The championship runners-up Dinamo Minsk qualified for UEFA Cup. Bronze medalists and 1996–97 Cup winners Belshina Bobruisk qualified for the Cup Winners' Cup. Obuvshchik Lida and Vedrich Rechitsa, placed 15th and 16th respectively, relegated to the First League.

Teams and venues

Table

Results

Belarusian clubs in European Cups

Top scorers

See also
1996 Belarusian First League
1995–96 Belarusian Cup
1996–97 Belarusian Cup

External links
RSSSF

Belarusian Premier League seasons
1
Belarus
Belarus